The 1985 Boise State Broncos football team represented Boise State University in the 1985 NCAA Division I-AA football season. The Broncos competed in the Big Sky Conference and played their home games on campus at Bronco Stadium in Boise, Idaho. The Broncos were led by third–year head coach Lyle Setencich, Boise State was 7–4 overall and 5–2 in conference.

Schedule

Roster

References

External links
 Bronco Football Stats – 1985

Boise State
Boise State Broncos football seasons
Boise State Broncos football